Gerben-Jan Gerbrandy (born 28 June 1967) is a Dutch politician who served as Member of the European Parliament (MEP) from 2009 until 2019. He is a member of Democrats 66, part of the Alliance of Liberals and Democrats for Europe.

Political career 
Gerbrandy is a member of liberal party Democrats 66.

Gerbrandy first became a Member of the European Parliament (MEP) in the 2009 elections. Throughout his time in parliament, he served on the Committee on the Environment, Public Health and Food Safety. Between 2012 and 2014, he was the committee’s vice-chairman. In this capacity, he chaired part of the negotiations on an EU ban on ‘invasive alien species’ that have a negative impact on the environment. He was also part of the European Parliament’s delegations to the 2014 United Nations Climate Change Conference in Lima; the 2015 United Nations Climate Change Conference in Paris; and the 2016 United Nations Climate Change Conference in Marrakesh.

In 2016, Gerbrandy joined the Committee of Inquiry into Emission Measurements in the Automotive Sector. That same year, he was appointed as the parliament’s rapporteur on national emissions reduction targets.

Between 2009 and 2014, Gerbrandy also served on the Committee on Budgetary Control. In this capacity, he drafted the committee’s opinion on the spending of the more than 30 agencies of the European Union in 2013.

In addition, Gebrandy was the vice chairman of the European Parliament Intergroup on Seas, Rivers, Islands and Coastal Areas as well as a member of the European Parliament Intergroup on the Welfare and Conservation of Animals. He was also a supporter of the MEP Heart Group, a group of parliamentarians who have an interest in promoting measures that will help reduce the burden of cardiovascular diseases (CVD).

See also
 List of Dutch politicians

External links 
 Official website by Gerbrandy
 Europaparliament: Gerben-Jan Gerbrandy

References

1967 births
Living people
Politicians from The Hague
Democrats 66 MEPs
MEPs for the Netherlands 2009–2014
MEPs for the Netherlands 2014–2019